Martin "Moishe" Rosen (April 12, 1932 – May 19, 2010) was an American minister and the founder and former Executive Director of Jews for Jesus, a Christian missionary organization that focuses on evangelism to Jews.

Biography
Rosen was born in Kansas City, Missouri, the son of Ben Rosen and Rose Baker. He was raised in Denver, Colorado. According to Rosen, his mother's parents were "Reform Jews from Austria" and his paternal grandfather was an Orthodox Jew. Although his father regularly attended an Orthodox synagogue, Rosen describes him as irreligious and viewing religion as a "racket".

Rosen married Ceil Starr on August 18, 1950, and they became Christians in 1953. After graduating from Northeastern Bible College, Rosen made a commitment to be a missionary to Jews. He was ordained as a Conservative Baptist minister in 1957. He led Hebrew Christian congregations and worked for 17 years for the American Board of Missions to the Jews (ABMJ), (now called Chosen People Ministries), with the aim of attracting converts. Beginning in 1970, he founded Hineni Ministries under the umbrella of ABMJ, later to become Jews for Jesus. In 1973, he left the employment of ABMJ to incorporate Jews for Jesus as a separate mission. In 1986, he received an honorary Doctor of Divinity Degree from Western Conservative Baptist Seminary in Portland, Oregon.

He stepped down from his position as Jews for Jesus' Executive Director in 1996, and continued to be employed as a staff missionary, remaining one of fifteen board members until his death in May 2010. In 1997, the Conservative Baptist Association named him a "Hero of the Faith."

Death
A March 2010 article on Charisma Magazine's website indicated that Rosen had been suffering from a number of serious health issues, including bone cancer. Rosen died on May 19, 2010 of prostate cancer in San Francisco, California.

Publications
Rosen wrote numerous books, including:
Sayings of Chairman Moishe (1972)
Jews for Jesus (1974)
Share the New Life with a Jew (1976)
Christ in the Passover (1977)
Y'shua: the Jewish way to say Jesus (1982)
Overture to Armageddon  (1991)
The Universe is Broken: Who on Earth Can Fix It? (1991)
Demystifying Personal Evangelism (1992)
Witnessing to Jews (1998)
Christ in the Passover (2006) [revised and expanded]

References

External links and further reading
Ruth Rosen, Called to Controversy: The Unlikely Story of Moishe Rosen and the Founding of Jews for Jesus, Thomas Nelson (2012), hardcover, 320 pages, 
"The Very First Jew for Jesus: Moishe Rosen's Controversial Story, Told by his Daughter" book review by Raphael Magarik in The Jewish Daily Forward, April 10, 2012, issue of April 13, 2012.
Ruth Tucker, Not Ashamed: The Story of Jews for Jesus, Multnomah Press (2000) 
Juliene G. Lipson, Jews for Jesus: An Anthropological Study, AMS Press (1990) 

1932 births
2010 deaths
20th-century American male writers
20th-century Baptist ministers
21st-century American male writers
21st-century Baptist ministers
American people of Austrian-Jewish descent
Baptist ministers from the United States
Baptist writers
Converts to Protestantism from Judaism
Deaths from cancer in California
Deaths from prostate cancer
Jews for Jesus
Messianic clergy
Northeastern Bible College alumni